Holzhaider is a surname. Notable people with the surname include:

 Hans Holzhaider (born 1946), German journalist
 Rainer Holzhaider (born 1956), Austrian rower